The Kedma School is a high school in Katamonim, Jerusalem.

History
As of 2011, the school had 160 students in grades 7–12. Kedma opened in 1994. As of 2011 the class ratio is one to 13.

As of 2011, most students are Jews from North Africa, including Moroccan; Sephardi; Ethiopian; and Kurdish origins. Most of the students had previously substandard test scores and/or issues with discipline and therefore had left their mainstream schools.

See also
Education in Israel

References

Further reading
 Bar Shalom, Y. and Krumer Navo, M. (2007). "The usage of qualitiative methods as means to empower disadvantaged groups: The example of the Kedma School in Jerusalem." The International Journal of Interdisciplinary Social Sciences. 2 (1), p. 237–244.
 Bairey Ben-Ishay, A. (1998). "Teacher burnout and consciousness-complexity: An Analysis of the mentors at Kedma (An Alternative Israeli High School)." Harvard University Doctoral dissertation.

External links
 Kedma School
 Kedma School 
 Kedma School - Matanel Foundation

Schools in Jerusalem
1994 establishments in Israel
Educational institutions established in 1994
High schools in Israel